Jujubinus ruscurianus is a species of sea snail, a marine gastropod mollusk in the family Trochidae, the top snails.

Description
The size of the shell varies between 4 mm and 7 mm.

Distribution
This species occurs in the Atlantic Ocean off Portugal and Morocco; in the Alboran Sea and in the Western Mediterranean Sea.

References

 Weinkauff H. C., 1867–1868: Die Conchylien des Mittelmeeres, ihre geographische und geologisches Verbreitung; T. Fischer, Cassel, Vol. 1: pp. XIX + 307 [1867]. Vol. 2: pp. VI + 512. [1868] 
 Pallary P., 1920: Exploration scientifique du Maroc organisée par la Société de Géographie de Paris et continuée par la Société des Sciences Naturelles du Maroc. Deuxième fascicule. Malacologie (1912) Larose, Rabat et Paris pp. 108, 1 pl., 1 map 
 Nordsieck F., 1973: Il genere Jujubinus Monterosato, 1884 in Europa; La Conchiglia 50: 6–7, 11–12
 Gofas, S.; Le Renard, J.; Bouchet, P. (2001). Mollusca, in: Costello, M.J. et al. (Ed.) (2001). European register of marine species: a check-list of the marine species in Europe and a bibliography of guides to their identification. Collection Patrimoines Naturels, 50: pp. 180–213

External links
 

ruscurianus
Gastropods described in 1868